The Northern Raqqa offensive was a 2016 military offensive launched by the Kurdish-led Syrian Democratic Forces against the Islamic State of Iraq and the Levant in northern Raqqa Governorate, in order to prepare for a future attack on the city of Raqqa. The offensive was launched in coordination with airstrikes by the US-led Combined Joint Task Force – Operation Inherent Resolve. After 30 May, the offensive stalled, as the SDF shifted its focus and resources to another operation in the northern Aleppo Province.

Background 
On 1 April 2016, Democratic Union Party (PYD) leader Salih Muslim stated that Syrian Democratic Forces (SDF) forces were preparing with the US-led coalition to launch an offensive on Raqqa.

U.S. Central Command Commander General Joseph L. Votel, the highest-ranking U.S. military official to visit Syria since the war erupted in 2011, came to Northern Syria in May 2016.

Kurdish forces established a stronghold about 37 kilometers (23 miles) north of Raqqa. ISIL reportedly used the residents of Raqqa as human shields, preventing them from leaving the city.

According to Joshua Walker of the German Marshall Fund, Raqqa could be "the beginning of the end" for ISIL, and the most important offensive since Kobani in 2015.

Preparations 
On 20 May the US-led coalition dropped leaflets on the city, encouraging the residents to leave.

The SDF is led and dominated by YPG forces, which generally consist of Kurds. To avoid ethnic tensions with Raqqa's majority Arab population, US special forces trained more than 200 Arab fighters to take part in the offensive.

The announcement for the offensive was made on 24 May, when the 30,000-strong SDF announced the offensive, "with participation from all SDF units", mobilising thousands of fighters in the countryside north of Raqqa, with the aim of expelling ISIL fighters from north of al-Raqqa.

The US-led coalition stated that it would provide air support for the offensive. Russian foreign minister Sergei Lavrov announced that his country was ready to coordinate with U.S. and Kurdish forces in the offensive, but the U.S., distrustful of the Russian establishment, turned down the offer.

The offensive 
On 21 May 2016 the SDF, led by the YPG, captured the village of al-Hishah, near the town of Ayn Issa in the northern countryside from ISIL, killing eight fighters. In the following days additional SDF fighters were mobilized from Tell Abyad to Ayn Issa. ISIL fighters in Raqqa responded by creating defensive lines and tunnels in the city. seven Coalition airstrikes on ISIL positions were confirmed on 23 May. On 25 May, the SDF took control of the Namrodia and Matmashraja villages near Ayn Issa.

On 26 May, the SDF reported new gains. SDF forces took the villages of Qartaja, al-Fastah, Indebin and Matmasraja. They had advanced some 6 km into IS-held lands north of Raqqa, and killed at least 31 ISIL fighters. By 30 May, ISIL had redeployed 2,000 to 3,000 militants to Raqqa, from Mosul and other areas controlled by ISIL. It was also reported that ISIL's use of civilians as human shields was slowing down the SDF advance. Later on the same day, the SDF captured an additional nine villages from ISIL, in the northern countryside of Raqqa.

Aftermath 
On 3 June 2016, a YPG unit infiltrated into a detention center in Raqqa city and raided it, rescuing a number of prisoners, including a Yezidi family.

See also 
 Battle of Raqqa (2013)
 Manbij offensive, a follow-up Kurdish offensive in the "Manbij Pocket" in the northern Aleppo Governorate, Syria
 Raqqa campaign (2016–17)
 Third Battle of Fallujah, a simultaneous Iraqi offensive against ISIL-held Fallujah, Iraq

References 

May 2016 events in Syria
Military operations of the Syrian civil war in 2016
Military operations of the Syrian civil war involving the Islamic State of Iraq and the Levant
Military operations of the Syrian civil war involving the People's Protection Units
Military operations of the Syrian civil war involving the Syrian Democratic Forces
Military operations of the Syrian civil war involving the United States
Raqqa Governorate in the Syrian civil war
Tell Abyad District